The Kënga Magjike 2019 was the 21st edition of the annual music contest Kënga Magjike and was held on 4, 5 and 7 December 2019 at the Pallati i Kongreseve in Tirana broadcast live on Televizioni Klan (TV Klan). Ardit Gjebrea and Adrola Dushi were the hosts of the three live shows. The proceeds from the ticket sales was donated to the people affected by the 2019 earthquake in Albania. Anna Oxa, as she stated, bought a ticket and sat with the public in the first semi-final as an act of solidarity.

The winner of this year's edition was Eneda Tarifa with the song titled "Ma Zgjat Dorën". It was her first victory after two previous participations in 2006 and 2008.

Format 

Kënga Magjike 2019, organised by Televizioni Klan (TV Klan), was the twenty-first consecutive edition of the annual contest. The two semi-finals and grand final were held at the Pallati i Kongreseve in Tirana on 4, 5 and 7 December 2019.

Contestants 
   
The contestants of this year's edition of Kënga Magjike were presented on the TV Klan live broadcast "E Diela Shqiptare" on every Sunday beginning from the 22 September 2019 until 1 December 2019 hosted by Ardit Gjebrea. The contestants who were qualified for the semi-finals were announced on 1 December 2019 at "E Diela Shqiptare".

The participating artists and bands are divided into two broader categories such as the Big Artists and New Artists. The New Artists perform live in front of a jury while the Big Artists are automatically qualified for the semi-finals. The jury was composed of Enkel Demi, Arben Skenderi, Armend Rexhepagiqi, Jonida Maliqi, Dj Missrose and Dj Stone. 
 
Key:
 Qualified for the semi-finals
 Withdrawn

Semi-finals

Semi-final 1 

The first semi-final took place on 4 December 2019.

Semi-final 2 

The second semi-final took place on 5 December 2019.

Final 
 
The grand final took place on 7 December 2019.

Key:
 Winner
 Second place
 Third place

Special awards

References 

2019
2019 song contests
December 2019 events in Europe
2019 in Albanian music